Vic-Mireval station (French: Gare de Vic-Mireval) is a railway station in Mireval, Occitanie, southern France. Within TER Occitanie, it is part of line 21 (Narbonne–Avignon).

References

Railway stations in Hérault